

514001–514100 

|-bgcolor=#f2f2f2
| colspan=4 align=center | 
|}

514101–514200 

|-id=107
| 514107 Kaʻepaokaʻawela ||  || In the Hawaiian language Kaʻepaokaʻāwela means the mischievous opposite-moving companion of Jupiter, evoking the image of a retrograde object of unknown origin. He hoa hōkūnaʻi ʻeʻepa no Kaʻāwela e holo ʻēkoʻa ana ma ka poe lā. Name conceived by A Hua He Inoa, ʻImiloa Astronomy Center of Hawaiʻi. || 
|}

514201–514300 

|-bgcolor=#f2f2f2
| colspan=4 align=center | 
|}

514301–514400 

|-bgcolor=#f2f2f2
| colspan=4 align=center | 
|}

514401–514500 

|-bgcolor=#f2f2f2
| colspan=4 align=center | 
|}

514501–514600 

|-bgcolor=#f2f2f2
| colspan=4 align=center | 
|}

514601–514700 

|-bgcolor=#f2f2f2
| colspan=4 align=center | 
|}

514701–514800 

|-bgcolor=#f2f2f2
| colspan=4 align=center | 
|}

514801–514900 

|-bgcolor=#f2f2f2
| colspan=4 align=center | 
|}

514901–515000 

|-bgcolor=#f2f2f2
| colspan=4 align=center | 
|}

References 

514001-515000